is a railway station on the Osaka Metro Chūō Line (station number: C14) and the Hanshin Railway Hanshin Namba Line (station number: HS 44) in Kujo Itchome, Nishi-ku, Osaka, Japan.

Layout

Osaka Metro Chuo Line

This elevated station is located above Chuo Odori Street and below the Hanshin Expressway Route 16 Osaka Port Line. 2 side platforms serving a track each are located on the third floor. Ticket gates are located in the east and the west on the second floor. The west gates became in use on March 20, 2009, the day of the opening of the Hanhsin Namba Line. The gates were in use from the opening in 1964, but closed after the opening of the east gates until 2009.

Hanshin Railway Hanshin Namba Line

An island platform serving 2 tracks is located on the 2nd level below the ground.

2 entrances are located. Entrance 1 is located along Chuo Odori Street and close to the west entrance of Kujo Station owned by Osaka Metro. Entrance 2 is located on the 1st floor of NTT West Building along Kujo Nakadori Route.

When Hanshin Railway was planning to extend a railway line to Namba in the 1960s, 2 entrances were situated for the line, 1 was in Nippon Telegraph and Telephone Public Corporation Building (present: NTT West Building) and the other was Sumikin Kosan Kujo Building (present: Nippon Steel & Sumikin Kosan Kujo Building). After 42 years, the former became in use for Hanshin Railway Kujo Station Entrance 2. The latter is no longer in use because it is connected to the paid area.

Surroundings
Chuō Ōdōri
Hanshin Expressway Route 16 Osaka Port Line
Osaka Dome
Osaka Kujo Post Office
Nine Mall Kujo (Buffa-Road; Buffaloes Road)
Kirara Kujo Shopping Street
Kujo Shin-ei-kai Shopping Street (Shin-chan Road)
Kujo Sennichi Street

Stations next to Kujo

Railway stations in Japan opened in 2009
Railway stations in Japan opened in 1964
Railway stations in Osaka Prefecture
Stations of Hanshin Electric Railway
Osaka Metro stations